Neopan was originally a family of black-and-white films from Japanese manufacturer Fujifilm for both professional and amateur use. The range now only comprises one film; Neopan ACROS 100 II, a traditional silver halide black and white film re-launched in 2019 and currently sold worldwide.

Current Films

Neopan ACROS 100 II
After the discontinuation of ACROS in April 2018, just over a year later in June 2019 Fujifilm announced their return to traditional silver halide black and white film with an updated Neopan ACROS 100 II. Film shipments commenced in Japan in November 2019, with global availability expected from Spring 2020.

A reformulated version of Neopan 100 ACROS,“achieving ultra-high image quality with world-class granularity and three-dimensional tone reproduction" to address the loss of some component raw materials that led to the originals withdrawal. This new emulsion appears to differ slightly from the original ACROS with "the gradation of the highlight part [..] designed to be sharper" according to machine translations of the Japanese press release. The film retains the reciprocity characteristics of the original. Formats: 135-36 exp. and 120 single rolls.

The new packaging for 120 format comes with 'Made in UK' labelling and is only available in single rolls compared to Fujifilms normal 5-roll packs leading to speculation about the films origin. Although the emulsion coating is still undertaken at the Kanagawa Factory, Ashigara in Japan, users speculate that conversion and packaging has been outsourced to Harman Technology in the UK.

Discontinued Films

Neopan ACROS 100
ACROS was an ISO 100 speed professional ortho-panchromatic black-and-white photographic film for portraits, landscape, architectural subjects and product photography. It used fuji color film technology to give high sharpness and fine grain. The film was particularly suited for night and long exposure photography due to its reciprocity characteristics: it does not require adjustments for exposures shorter than 120 seconds, and only requires a ½ stop of compensation for exposures between 120 and 1000 seconds.  The film was produced in 135, 120 and Sheet film formats.

ACROS sheet film (4x5" & 8x10") was discontinued in October 2017. ACROS in the remaining 135 and 120 formats was discontinued in April 2018. 120 format was largely sold out by June 2018, whilst 135 format stock remained on sale in most markets until Spring 2019. All Fujifilm black and white photopapers were also discontinued at the same time. The lack of availability of some of the film component raw materials was cited as the reason for its withdrawal.

Neopan 100 SS
Neopan 100 SS was an easy to use 100 ISO medium speed, fine grain, ortho-panchromatic film with a wide
exposure latitude. Sold in Asian and selected markets, parallel import elsewhere. It was produced for 35mm, medium format, and sheet film cameras in various sizes and discontinued in 2011

Neopan 400 Professional (Presto)
Neopan 400 Professional ('Presto' in Japan) was a high speed, black and white negative film with an ISO speed of 400 for action and press photography. It was produced for 35mm, medium format and 4x5" cameras and discontinued in 2013.

Neopan 1600 Professional (Super Presto)
Neopan 1600 Professional ('Super Presto' in Japan) was an ultra high speed panchromatic film with E.I. 1600 for sports, journalism, stage shows and low light situations. It offers the same development time as Neopan 400 to enable the films to be processed together. It was produced for 35mm cameras and discontinued in 2009.

Neopan 400CN
Neopan 400CN was an ISO 400 General purpose C-41 process chromogenic B&W film on a triacetate base. Ilford were Fuji’s partners for this film which has therefore similar characteristics to Ilford XP2 plus. Since at least 2018 distribution was limited to the UK only and was discontinued in 2020. Formats: 135, 120.

See also
List of photographic films
List of discontinued photographic films

References

External links 
 Fujifilm Neopan black & white films
 Fuji Acros 100 Data Sheet
 Fuji Acros 100 (120) Data Sheet

Fujifilm photographic films